Erwin Library and Pratt House is a historic library building and house located in Boonville in Oneida County, New York. The library building was built in 1890 of rock-faced local limestone with a square tower at the entrance.  The Pratt House was constructed in 1875.  It is of brick with a foundation of smooth limestone and a mansard roof with a central tower.

It was listed on the National Register of Historic Places in 1973.

References

Houses on the National Register of Historic Places in New York (state)
Houses completed in 1875
Libraries in New York (state)
Houses in Oneida County, New York
Individually listed contributing properties to historic districts on the National Register in New York (state)
National Register of Historic Places in Oneida County, New York